Angelika Beer (born 24 May 1957 in Kiel) is a German politician.
2004 to 2009 she was a Member of the European Parliament for Alliance 90/The Greens, part of the European Greens. She was chair of the delegation for relations with Iran and a member on the delegation for relations with Afghanistan and the Delegation for relations with the NATO Parliamentary Assembly, the Foreign Affairs committee and the Subcommittee on Security and Defence.

In January, she was not reelected on a place on the European Parliamentary election list for Alliance 90/The Greens. She left the Green Party at the end of March 2009. As a reason for her exit, she criticised the Green Party's aspiration after power and the loss of its pacifistic orientation.

In November 2009 she became a member of Pirate Party Germany. In May 2012 she was elected as one of six Pirates to become a member of the state parliament of Schleswig-Holstein.
Angelika Beer is married since 2003 with Bundeswehr Colonel lieutenant Peter Matthiesen.

External links 

  Angelika Beer official website
 Beer now member of the Pirate Party (German)
 "Der Zopf bleibt", Der Spiegel (2 May 2001)

1957 births
Living people
Alliance 90/The Greens politicians
MEPs for Germany 2004–2009
Members of the Bundestag for Schleswig-Holstein
Members of the Bundestag 1998–2002
Members of the Bundestag 1994–1998
Members of the Bundestag 1987–1990
21st-century women MEPs for Germany
Politicians from Kiel
Alliance 90/The Greens MEPs
Pirate Party Germany politicians
20th-century German women